The Military Medical Academy of the Armed Forces of Uzbekistan is a specialized educational institution in the Armed Forces of Uzbekistan, under the Education System of the Ministry of Defense in Tashkent. It trains officers of medical services and medical officers of the reserve. The cadets who graduated from the bachelor's degree at the academy are initially awarded the military rank of "lieutenant of medical service" and are issued a diploma in the specialty "military doctor".

History 
It was established on 22 October 2020 by order of President Shavkat Mirziyoyev. It was formed from the former Military Medical Faculty of the Tashkent Medical Academy. In accordance with the Resolution of the Cabinet of Ministers of the Republic of Uzbekistan on June 10, 2012, the Military Medical Faculty was established. It was located on the campus of academy, in an adapted two-story building (a former residential cottage), having its own territory, drill ground, warehouse, garage.

Tasks 
The main tasks of the academy are:

 Training, and retraining personnel in the field of military medicine for the ministries and departments that are part of the Armed Forces of Uzbekistan.
 Training scientific-pedagogical personnel, as well as reserve officers of the medical service.
 Conducting research work aimed at solving existing problems in the practice of military medicine.
 Conducting scientific research on the development of the educational process in the field of healthcare.

See also 
 S. M. Kirov Military Medical Academy
 Uniformed Services University of the Health Sciences

References 

Educational institutions established in 2020
Military academies of Uzbekistan
2020 establishments in Uzbekistan
Military medical organizations
Medical schools in Uzbekistan